Gessica Turato (born 30 July 1984) is a track and road cyclist from Italy. As a junior, she won the individual pursuit at the 2001 UEC European Track Championships. She won the under-23 road race at the 2005 European Road Championships and represented her nation later that year at the 2005 UCI Road World Championships.

References

External links
 profile at Procyclingstats.com

1984 births
Italian female cyclists
Living people
People from Cittadella
Cyclists from the Province of Padua